Moldova competed at the 2018 Summer Youth Olympics, in Buenos Aires, Argentina from 6 October to 18 October 2018.

Archery

Moldova qualified one athlete based on its performance at the 2017 World Archery Youth Championships.

Team

Athletics

 Women's Shot Put - Nina Capaţina

Badminton

Moldova qualified two players based on the Badminton Junior World Rankings.

Singles

Team

Judo

 Girls' 44 kg - Paulina Țurcan
 Boys' 100 kg - Alin Bagrin

Individual

Team

Modern pentathlon

 Boy's events - Alex Vasilianov

Rowing

Moldova qualified one boat based on its performance at the 2018 European Rowing Junior Championships.

 Boys' single sculls - 1 boat (Ivan Corșunov)

FB=Final B (non-medal)

Shooting

 1 quota: Boys' 10 metre air pistol

Individual

Team

Swimming

 Tatiana Salcuțan
 Anastasia Moșcenscaia
 Nichita Bortnicov
 Ivan Semidetnov

Table tennis

Moldova qualified one table tennis player based on its performance at the European Continental Qualifier.

 Boys' singles - Vladislav Ursu

Wrestling

Moldova qualified one athlete in category Women's Wrestling 57 kg

Key:
  – Victory by Fall
  – Without any points scored by the opponent
  – With point(s) scored by the opponent
  – Without any points scored by the opponent
  – With point(s) scored by the opponent

References

2018 in Moldovan sport
Nations at the 2018 Summer Youth Olympics
Moldova at the Youth Olympics